Dr Dov Bar-Nir (3 December 1911 – 7 May 2000) was a Belgium-born Israeli politician who served as a member of the Knesset for Mapam between 1949 and 1951.

Biography
Born Bernard Silberschatz in Brussels in Belgium, Bar-Nir studied social science at the University of Strasbourg, where he was awarded a PhD. He was amongst the founders of the Hashomer Hatzair movement in Belgium.

He made aliyah to Mandatory Palestine in 1932, and joined kibbutz Ein HaHoresh, where he lived until 1956. He was a member of the Socialist League party, which later merged with the HaKibbutz HaArtzi movement to form the Hashomer Hatzair Workers Party, which he served as secretary of from its foundation in 1946 until its merger into Mapam in 1948.

In the 1949 elections he won a seat on Mapam's list. In 1950, he was sent to the United States to work as an emissary of Hashomer Hatzair. He subsequently resigned from the Knesset and was replaced by Menachem Ratzon on 10 April 1951. Between 1951 and 1953, he served as secretary of Mapam's central committee and, from 1957 until 1960, as secretary of the World Union of Mapam.

After retiring from the Knesset, he published several books, including Trends in Modern Art (1954), From Jabotinsky to Begin: Portrait of a Movement (1982), Politicide: An Israel Socialist Answers a Foreign Socialist (1982), The Confrontation: Ben-Gurion and Jabotinsky (1987) and Opinions Make Their Way.

References

External links
 

1911 births
2000 deaths
Belgian emigrants to Mandatory Palestine
Belgian Jews
Israeli non-fiction writers
Israeli people of Belgian-Jewish descent
Jews in Mandatory Palestine
Jewish socialists
Hashomer Hatzair members
Mapam politicians
Members of the 1st Knesset (1949–1951)
Politicians from Brussels
University of Strasbourg alumni
20th-century non-fiction writers